Nurul Zikra (born 21 July 1991) is an Indonesian footballer who currently plays as a forward for Persiraja Banda Aceh in Liga 2, rejoined the club from PSAB Aceh Besar. He had played for Persiraja before, when Persiraja were competing in Indonesian Premier League in 2013 season, the highest tier in Indonesian football league system at that time.

References

1991 births
Living people
Indonesian footballers
Persiraja Banda Aceh players
Association football forwards
Sportspeople from Aceh